The 2006–07 A1 Grand Prix of Nations, Malaysia is an A1 Grand Prix race, to be held on November 26, 2006, at Sepang International Circuit, Malaysia. This shall be the fourth race in the 2006-07 A1 Grand Prix season and the second meeting held at the circuit.

Report

Practice

Qualifying

Sprint race

Main race
In wet conditions, Team Germany driver Nico Hülkenberg dominated the field and won by over 40 seconds.

Results

Qualification

Qualification took place on Saturday, November 25, 2006

*After an incident in Qualifying segment 1, in which Germany's Nico Hülkenberg was judged to have caused an avoidable collision with Ireland's Michael Devaney, Hülkenberg was deducted his fastest time, though his had no effect on his Sprint race starting grid position.

**After an incident in Qualifying segment 2, in which South Africa's Adrian Zaugg was judged to have blocked USA driver Philip Giebler during his fast lap, Zaugg was deducted his fastest time, resulting in him moving from 8th to 11th on the Sprint race starting grid.

***After an incident in Qualifying segment 2, in which Indonesia's Ananda Mikola was judged to have blocked Italy's Enrico Toccacelo during his fast lap, Mikola was deducted his fastest time, resulting in him moving from 18th to 19th on the Sprint race starting grid.

Sprint Race Results
The Sprint race took place on Sunday, November 26, 2006

Feature Race Results
The Feature race took place on Sunday, November 26, 2006

Total Points

 Fastest Lap:

References

Malaysia
A1 Grand Prix
Motorsport competitions in Malaysia